Theatre of the Mind may refer to:

 Theatre of the Mind (Mystery album), a 1996 album by Mystery
 Theater of the Mind, a 2008 album by Ludacris
 Theatre of the Mind (TV series), a 1949 American television series